The 1921 All-Ireland Senior Football Championship was the 35th staging of Ireland's premier Gaelic football knock-out competition. Dublin were the winners. They ended Tipperary's All Ireland title in the final.

Tipperary were awarded the Munster title due to Civil War the rest of the Munster counties didn't complete in the championship.

Results

Connacht Senior Football Championship

Leinster Senior Football Championship

Munster Senior Football Championship
The championship was not held due to the Irish Civil War.  were chosen to represent the province.

Ulster Senior Football Championship

All-Ireland Senior Football Championship

Championship statistics

Miscellaneous
 Many games were delayed due to home rule protests.
 Dublin's Semi-Final win v Monaghan was played just one week after Dublin's loss in the 1920 All-Ireland Senior Football Championship Final. Despite this they had to wait almost one year to play the final, owing to the political turmoil. 
 Mayo's Semi-Final v Tipperary was originally scheduled for 15 April 1923, but was postponed for one week. Mayo refused a walkover from Tipperary in respect of the Semi-Final scheduled for 22 April 1923, and the match was again rescheduled for 29 April. Tipperary could not field a team on 29 April.

References